Pseudhecyra albofasciata is a species of beetle in the family Cerambycidae, and the only species in the genus Pseudhecyra. It was described by Breuning in 1976.

References

Crossotini
Beetles described in 1976
Monotypic beetle genera